Iisa Pa Lamang (International title: My Only One / ) is a 2008 Philippine melodrama romantic suspense television series directed by Ruel S. Bayani and Manny Q. Palo. The series stars an ensemble cast consisting of Claudine Barretto, Angelica Panganiban, Diether Ocampo, Gabby Concepcion, Cherry Pie Picache, Susan Roces, Laurice Guillen, Joel Torre, Melissa Ricks, and Matt Evans. The series premiered on ABS-CBN's Primetime Bida nighttime block replacing Lobo on its timeslot from July 14 to November 7, 2008.

The series is part of ABS-CBN International Sales, a line-up of Filipino telenovelas.

The series ended with 85 episodes

Synopsis
The story revolves on a barrio lass Catherine Ramirez (Claudine Barretto), a young woman who has been deprived of everything. Due to her mother's death and her father's disappearance, she is concerned that one day someone will abandon her and she will end up like her parents. She grows up in the care of her grandmother Aurora (Susan Roces). The family is connected to the Castillejos, a family Aurora is a part of; she was born out of wedlock to the late Castillejo patriarch.

Their lives seem to be in an unlikely fate when Isadora (Cherry Pie Picache) the greedy new wife of Aurora's stepbrother, tries to take control of half of their property. Isadora has a son named Miguel. On the night of their arrival Miguel runs away after being horribly abused by his mother. Miguel runs into the barn; Catherine follows him and sees him crying. The young Rafael (AJ Perez) saves the two in from a fire. Catherine suddenly sees Rafael as a guardian while Miguel owes him his life, but is jealous. The young puppy love is cut short, but Catherine remembers the promise the three made that when the time comes they will all meet again.

Catherine grows into a beautiful woman. When Miguel (Diether Ocampo) comes home, a longing affection strikes them and draws an attraction. But beyond their happiest moments Rafael (Gabby Concepcion) comes home to visit the two. What Catherine does not know is that they returned just to see her and spend time with her. Miguel's ex-girlfriend Scarlet (Angelica Panganiban) comes  home from abroad to disturb Miguel. Catherine and Miguel try to escape and get help from Rafael. Catherine is abducted, leaving them worried and speechless.

Three months pass and Catherine is trapped in a basement. She tries her best to run away and is saved by Louella from this heartache. She decides to regain her strength from the pain that this has caused her. Catherine, in the middle of hope and salvation, meets a rich old man Martin Dela Rhea (Bembol Roco). After finding important belongings and a load of cash at a park, he repays the offer by giving her a scholarship. She agrees and does well; leading her to a position and eventually, a proposal of marriage. Even though her grandmother opposes, she uses this as a way to fight off Isadora and Scarlet, who is revealed to be Martin's spoiled daughter and now Miguel's wife. But how long will she be happy? How long will she suffer the consequences of her decision? Who will be the only one so far to love her? In the end, whom will she choose: Rafael or Miguel

Cast

Main cast

Supporting cast

Guest cast 
 Frances Makil-Ignacio as Winnie "Tita Winnie" Ignacio: One of Scarlet's employees and friend. 
 Martin del Rosario as Eric Suarez: Toby's friend. 
 Reb Sibal as Jonas
 Beauty Gonzalez as Jenna: Sofia's best friend 
 Cheska Garcia as Tracy
 Angel Aquino as young Isadora
 Aldred Gatchalian
 Neil Ryan Sese as Atty. Sanchez†
 Jefrrey Hidalgo as TBC: A woman Isadora hired to pose with Catherine, naked, hoping to destroy Miguel and Catherine's relationship by sending pictures. The former succeeds and their relationship is ruined. 
 Soliman Cruz
 Jeoff Monzon
 AJ Perez as young Rafael Torralba: Young Raphael saved Catherine and Miguel as becomes their "Kuya". 
 Chinggoy Alonzo as Don Amadeo Castillejos†: The late head of the Castillejos' clan and Aura's father. 
 Angelo Patrimonio
 Mika dela Cruz as young Sofia Castillejos / Sofia Ramirez
 Gemmae Custodio as young Catherine Ramirez
 Donita Rose as Rose Ramirez†: Rolando's wife and Catherine and Anna's late mother. 
 Bing Pimentel as Anna Ramirez†: Catherine's deceased older sister and Rose and Rolando's daughter. 
 John Suarez as young Miguel Castillejos: After being abused greatly by his mother, Isadora Castillejos, Miguel decided to run away and he meets Catherine and Raphael. Little did he know that they would be in a love triangle in their adult years.

International broadcast

See also
 List of shows previously aired by ABS-CBN
 List of dramas of ABS-CBN

References

ABS-CBN drama series
Television series by Dreamscape Entertainment Television
2008 Philippine television series debuts
2008 Philippine television series endings
Philippine melodrama television series
Thriller television series
Philippine romance television series
Filipino-language television shows
Television shows set in Manila
Television shows set in Quezon City